"The Valley Road" is a song recorded by Bruce Hornsby and the Range. Hornsby co-wrote the song with his brother John Hornsby and co-produced it with Neil Dorfsman. The song is included on Bruce Hornsby and the Range's 1988 album, Scenes from the Southside. It is written in the key of A major.

Released as the lead single from the album, "The Valley Road" reached the top ten on the Billboard Hot 100 chart in June 1988, peaking at number 5 the week of July 2. It also spent a week atop the Billboard adult contemporary chart in mid-June. This was the group's third song to reach number 1 on the adult contemporary chart, following "The Way It Is" from 1986 and "Mandolin Rain" from 1987. The single lodged three weeks at the summit on the Billboard mainstream rock chart, becoming the first of the group's two chart-toppers on that list. Roughly around the same time, the song reached number 44 on the UK Singles Chart.

Content
Hornsby was quoted in an interview with the Chicago Tribune saying that the song was inspired by observations he made growing up in the Commonwealth of Virginia. "Every year, some rich girl would get involved with some country guy, and they would act irresponsibly and have to deal with the ramifications." When asked why many of his band's songs dealt with socio-political issues, Hornsby replied that "there are some issues that we feel are important, so we write about them... we also like to tell a story, like in 'The Valley Road', or paint a picture."

Re-recorded version
In 1989, Hornsby re-recorded "The Valley Road" with the Nitty Gritty Dirt Band, which was included on the Dirt Band album Will the Circle Be Unbroken: Volume Two. Hornsby and the Dirt Band won a Grammy Award for this recording in 1990 in the category Best Bluegrass Recording. This version of the song was more in the country-bluegrass style of recording, inspired by Leon Russell and his collaborations with the New Grass Revival. Responding to some of the backlash he received from the bluegrass community on his Grammy win, Hornsby stated: "I won the bluegrass Grammy. It pissed off all the purists. And I understand their feeling about this. Here's this pop guy, and he's making this quasi-bluegrass. I totally understood the purists' protest."

Charts

Weekly charts

Year-end charts

References

External links
U.S. 7" release info Discogs

Bruce Hornsby songs
Nitty Gritty Dirt Band songs
Songs written by Bruce Hornsby
Songs written by John Hornsby
RCA Records singles
1988 songs
1988 singles